Airumbria S.r.l. was an Italian airline. It was founded in 1992 and operated business air taxi services. In 2014 or 2015, a new company, Prime Service Italia S.r.l., was launched as its successor.

See also
 List of defunct airlines of Italy

References

Defunct airlines of Italy